Harmeet Singh Khanna, better known by his stage name MixSingh, is an Indian music composer. He is primarily recognized for his compositions in Punjabi music. He has composed Punjabi songs like "Sakhiyaan" & "Ik Tera" Sung By Maninder Buttar, "Sorry" by Neha Kakkar, "Saara India" by Aastha Gill, "Phone Maar Di" by Gurnam Bhullar, "Tera Mera Viah" & "Shopping" by Jass Manak and "Light Weight" by Kulwinder Billa and Maninder Buttar's Debut album "Jugni" .

Selected discography

Albums as producer

Singles

Awards 
 PTC Punjabi Best Music Director For Single 2018 (Nominated)
 PTC Punjabi Best Sound Recording 2014 (Nominated)

References 
https://timesofindia.indiatimes.com/videos/entertainment/music/punjabi/watch-latest-2021-punjabi-song-tenu-chete-karda-sung-by-simar-dorraha/videoshow/82851167.cms

External links
 

Indian composers
Punjabi music
Indian record producers
Living people
People from Ludhiana district
Year of birth missing (living people)